Chicago Restaurant Week, is an event held once a year for seventeen days in which participating restaurants in Chicago offer prix fixe lunches and dinners. A celebration of Chicago's culinary scene featuring some of the finest restaurants, this can be a fraction of the usual prices.

The event is held in early winter (January). Chicago Restaurant Week has been hosted for 16 years as of January 2023.

History
Chicago Restaurant Week began as a celebration of the city's award-winning culinary scene. The event brought together the city's top restaurants, representing a near-endless array of cuisines. Tim Zagat and Joe Baum are credited for the "first restaurant week". Tim Zagat in a 2010 The Atlantic article said that he did not see or dream of the possibility of using American Express and Coca-Cola as sponsors for future events at the time.

Chicago Restaurant Week celebrated its 16th anniversary in 2023, 
The program continues annually as of 2023.

References

External links
 

Culture of Chicago
Recurring events established in 2007